Lützowplatz is a public, inner-city area with relatively high traffic in Berlin's Tiergarten district of Mitte.

Sculptures
 3-X-90 in Deutschland (1990) by Ernest Altés (Ates)
 Hercules and the Erymanthian Boar (1904) by Louis Tuaillon
 Stehende und liegende Gruppe (1980/85) by Sabina Grzimek

External links
 

Mitte